Chiaksan National Park is located in the province of Gangwon-do, South Korea. It was designated as the 16th national park in 1984. The park is named after the  mountain Chiaksan, which in turn had its name changed from Jeokakasan to Chiaksan, meaning "Pheasant Peak Mountain", based on a myth about a man who saved a pheasant from being eaten by a snake. The park is home to a total of 821 plant species and 2,364 animal species. Among the animals 34 are endangered, including the Flying squirrel and Hodgson's Bat.

References

External links
The park's page on Korea National Park Service's website

National parks of South Korea
Protected areas established in 1984
Parks in Gangwon Province, South Korea